Carlton John (1915 – 14 August 2008) was a West Indian cricket umpire. He stood in two Test matches in 1953, both against India.

See also
 List of Test cricket umpires
 Indian cricket team in West Indies in 1952–53

References

1915 births
2008 deaths
Place of birth missing
West Indian Test cricket umpires